The EF Standard English Test is a standardized test of the English language designed for non-native English speakers. It is the product of EF Education First, a global language training company, and a team of language assessment experts including Lyle Bachman, Mari Pearlman, and Ric Luecht. EF compares the EFSET's accuracy to the most widely used high stakes standardized English tests: TOEFL, IELTS, and Cambridge International Examinations.

There are two versions of the EFSET: a 15-minute test ("EFSET Quick English Check") & a 50-minute test ("EFSET English Certificate") which assigns a score on the 6-level Common European Framework of Reference for Languages (CEFR). Both test versions assess receptive skills only (reading and listening comprehension) and do not assess writing or speaking Unlike other standardized English tests, the EFSET uses computerized adaptive testing methods to adjust the difficulty of the test according to the examinee's ability level. The EFSET is not a proctored exam.

Test launch
EF Education First initially intended to build the EFSET for internal use as a low-cost alternative to third party standardized English tests, with the aim of attaining the same level of accuracy as those tests. Soon, the company realized it could gain branding benefits from releasing a robust, testing tool for any English learner to use. The initial public launch of the EFSET in 2014 was the result of a 3-year process, which included 15 months of formal trials involving 14,500 students.

Scoring
The EF SET English Certificate is scored on a scale of 0 to 100 with a separate score attributed for reading and listening as well as an overall score. EF SET English Certificate scores are mapped to the 6-level CEFR bands from A1 to C2 as well as to IELTS and TOEFL scores as shown in the table below.

References

Further reading 
"EFSET Technical Background Report", "EF Education First"
"EFSET official site", "EF Education First"

English language tests
English-language education
2014 introductions
EF Education First